This article serves as an index - as complete as possible - of all the honorific orders or similar decorations received by the Kelantan Royal Family, classified by continent, awarding country and recipient.

This is a list of honours and titles received by the royal family of Kelantan, one of the thirteen states of Malaysia.

Honours and titles 

They have been awarded:

 Muhammad V of Kelantan, Sultan of Kelantan (since 13 September 2010) :
  Recipient (DK, 6.10.1986) and Grand Master of the Royal Family Order or Star of Yunus
  Knight Grand Commander and Grand Master of the Order of the Crown of Kelantan or "Star of Muhammad" with title (SPMK, since 13 September 2010) with titile Dato  Knight Grand Commander and Grand Master of the Order of the Life of the Crown of Kelantan or "Star of Ismail" (SJMK, since 13 September 2010) with title Dato  Knight Grand Commander and Grand Master of the Order of the Loyalty to the Crown of Kelantan or "Star of Ibrahim" (SPSK, since 13 September 2010) with title Dato  Grand Master of the Order of the Noble Crown of Kelantan or "Star of Yahya" (SPKK, since 13 September 2010) with title Dato  Grand Master of the Order of the Most Distinguished and Most Valiant Warrior (PYGP, since 13 September 2010)
  Founding Grand Master of the Most Loyal Order of Services to the Crown of Kelantan or "Star of Petra" (SPJK, since 11 November 2016) with title Dato Ismail Petra of Kelantan, Sultan Muhammad V of Kelantan's father and retired Sultan for illness :
  Recipient and Grand Master of the Royal Family Order of Kelantan (DK, 29 March 1979 - 13 September 2010)
  Knight Grand Commander and Grand Master of the Order of the Crown of Kelantan (SPMK, 29 March 1979 - 13 September 2010) with title Dato  Knight Grand Commander and Grand Master of the Order of the Life of the Crown of Kelantan (SJMK, 29 March 1979 - 13 September 2010) with title Dato  Knight Grand Commander and Grand Master of the Order of the Loyalty to the Crown of Kelantan (SPSK, 29 March 1979 - 13 September 2010) with title Dato'''
  Founding Grand Master of the Order of the Noble Crown of Kelantan (SPKK, 1988 - 13 September 2010)
  Grand Master of the Order of the Most Distinguished and Most Valiant Warrior (PYGP, 29 March 1979 - 13 September 2010)
 Raja Perempuan Tengku Anis, Sultan Muhammad V of Kelantan's mother :
  Recipient of the Royal Family Order or Star of Yunus (DK, 30.3.1980)
  Knight Grand Commander of the Order of the Crown of Kelantan or "Star of Muhammad" (SPMK) with title Dato
 Tengku Muhammad Faiz Petra, eldest younger brother of Sultan Muhammad V of Kelantan
  Recipient of the Royal Family Order or Star of Yunus (DK, 30.3.2003)
  Knight Grand Commander of the Order of the Crown of Kelantan or "Star of Muhammad" (SPMK) with title Dato
 Tengku Muhammad Fakhry Petra, second younger brother of Sultan Muhammad V of Kelantan
  Recipient of the Royal Family Order or Star of Yunus (DK)
  Knight Grand Commander (SPMK) of the Order of the Crown of Kelantan or "Star of Muhammad"  with title Dato
 He was awarded the DK (30.3.2003) and the SPMK but those awards were rescinded on 30.9.2010. DK has been reinstated as of 11.11.2019. SPMK status unknown.
 Tengku Amalin Aishah Putri, sister of Sultan Muhammad V of Kelantan
  Recipient of the Royal Family Order or Star of Yunus (DK)
 Tengku Abdul Halim, granduncle of Sultan Muhammad V of Kelantan
  Recipient of the Royal Family Order or Star of Yunus (DK)
  Knight Grand Commander (SJMK) of the Order of the Life of the Crown of Kelantan or "Star of Ismail"  with title Dato
 Tengku Mohamad Rizam, cousin of Sultan Muhammad V of Kelantan
  Recipient of the Royal Family Order or Star of Yunus (DK)
  Knight Grand Commander (SPMK) of the Order of the Crown of Kelantan or "Star of Muhammad"  with title Dato
  Knight Grand Commander (SJMK) of the Order of the Life of the Crown of Kelantan or "Star of Ismail"  with title Dato
 Tengku Abdul Aziz, granduncle of the Sultan Muhammad V of Kelantan
  Recipient of the Royal Family Order or Star of Yunus (DK)
  Knight Grand Commander (SJMK) of the Order of the Life of the Crown of Kelantan or "Star of Ismail"  with title Dato
Both awards were rescinded some time in 2010. DK rumored to have been reinstated in June 2018. He has chosen to not wear any awards so we might never know if the reinstatement request was accepted by the recipient. Status of the SJMK award is unknown.
 Tengku Razaleigh, granduncle of the Sultan Muhammad V of Kelantan
  Recipient of the Royal Family Order or Star of Yunus (DK)
  Knight Grand Commander (SPMK) of the Order of the Crown of Kelantan or "Star of Muhammad"  with title Dato'Both awards were rescinded some time in 2010. DK rumored to have been reinstated in June 2018. He has chosen to not wear any awards so we might never know if the reinstatement request was accepted by the recipient. Status of the SPMK award is unknown.
 Tengku Robert, granduncle of the Sultan Muhammad V of Kelantan
  Knight Commander of the Order of the Life of the Crown of Kelantan or Star of Ismail (DJMK) with title Dato Tengku Merjan, aunt of the Sultan Muhammad V of Kelantan
  Knight Grand Commander (SJMK) of the Order of the Life of the Crown of Kelantan or "Star of Ismail"  with title Dato Tengku Rozan, aunt of the Sultan Muhammad V of Kelantan
  Knight Grand Commander (SJMK) of the Order of the Life of the Crown of Kelantan or "Star of Ismail"  with title Dato Tengku Salwani, aunt of the Sultan Muhammad V of Kelantan
  Knight Grand Commander (SJMK) of the Order of the Life of the Crown of Kelantan or "Star of Ismail"  with title Dato'''
 Tengku Faridah, grandaunt of the Sultan Muhammad V of Kelantan
  Knight Grand Commander (SJMK) of the Order of the Life of the Crown of Kelantan or "Star of Ismail"  with title Dato
 Raja Shah Zurin, cousin of the Sultan Muhammad V of Kelantan 
  Knight Grand Commander (SJMK) of the Order of the Life of the Crown of Kelantan or "Star of Ismail"  with title Dato
 Tengku Mahaleel, second cousin of the Sultan Muhammad V of Kelantan
  Knight Commander of the Order of the Crown of Kelantan or Star of Muhammad (DPMK) with title Dato

Malaysia, sultanates and states

Malaysia 

 Muhammad V of Kelantan, Sultan of Kelantan (since 13 September 2010) :
  Recipient of the Order of the Crown of the Realm (DMN, 7.12.2011)
 Ismail Petra of Kelantan, Sultan Muhammad V of Kelantan's father and retired Sultan for illness :
  Recipient of the Order of the Crown of the Realm (DMN)
  Grand Commander of the Order of the Defender of the Realm (SMN) with title Tun

Sultanate of Johor 
 Muhammad V of Kelantan, Sultan of Kelantan (since 13 September 2010) :
  First Class of the Royal Family Order of Johor (DK I, 14.4.2011)
 Ismail Petra of Kelantan, Sultan Muhammad V of Kelantan's father and retired Sultan for illness :
  First Class of the Royal Family Order of Johor (DK I)
 Raja Perempuan Tengku Anis, Sultan Muhammad V of Kelantan's mother :
  First Class of the Royal Family Order of Johor (DK I)

Sultanate of Kedah 

 Muhammad V of Kelantan, Sultan of Kelantan (since 13 September 2010) :
  Member of the Royal Family Order of Kedah (DK)
 Ismail Petra of Kelantan, Sultan Muhammad V of Kelantan's father and retired Sultan for illness :
  Member of the Royal Family Order of Kedah (DK)

Sultanate of Negeri Sembilan 

 Muhammad V of Kelantan, Sultan of Kelantan (since 13 September 2010) :
  Member of the Royal Family Order of Negeri Sembilan (DKNS, 13.1.2011)
 Ismail Petra of Kelantan, Sultan Muhammad V of Kelantan's father and retired Sultan for illness :
  Member of the Royal Family Order of Negeri Sembilan (DKNS)
 Raja Perempuan Tengku Anis, Sultan Muhammad V of Kelantan's mother :
  Member of the Royal Family Order of Negeri Sembilan (DKNS)

Sultanate of Pahang 

To be completed if any ...

Sultanate of Perak 

 Muhammad V of Kelantan, Sultan of Kelantan (since 13 September 2010) :
  Recipient of the Royal Family Order of Perak (DK)
 Ismail Petra of Kelantan, Sultan Muhammad V of Kelantan's father and retired Sultan for illness :
  Recipient of the Royal Family Order of Perak (DK)

Sultanate of Perlis 

 Muhammad V of Kelantan, Sultan of Kelantan (since 13 September 2010) :
  Recipient of the Perlis Family Order of the Gallant Prince Syed Putra Jamalullail (DK)
 Ismail Petra of Kelantan, Sultan Muhammad V of Kelantan's father and retired Sultan for illness :
  Recipient of the Perlis Family Order of the Gallant Prince Syed Putra Jamalullail (DK)
 Raja Perempuan Tengku Anis, Sultan Muhammad V of Kelantan's mother :
  Recipient of the Perlis Family Order of the Gallant Prince Syed Putra Jamalullail (DK)
  Knight Grand Commander of the Order of the Crown of Perlis or Star of Safi (SPMP, 1988) with title Dato' Seri

Sultanate of Selangor 

 Muhammad V of Kelantan, Sultan of Kelantan (since 13 September 2010) :
  First Class of the Royal Family Order of Selangor (DK I, 11.12.2010)
 Ismail Petra of Kelantan, Sultan Muhammad V of Kelantan's father and retired Sultan for illness :
  First Class of the Royal Family Order of Selangor (DK I, 13.11.1988)
 Raja Perempuan Tengku Anis, Sultan Muhammad V of Kelantan's mother :
  Second Class of the Royal Family Order of Selangor (DK II)

Sultanate of Terengganu 

 Muhammad V of Kelantan, Sultan of Kelantan (since 13 September 2010) :
  Member first class of the Family Order of Terengganu (DK I)
 Ismail Petra of Kelantan, Sultan Muhammad V of Kelantan's father and retired Sultan for illness :
  Member first class of the Family Order of Terengganu (DK I)

State of Sarawak 

 Ismail Petra of Kelantan, Sultan Muhammad V of Kelantan's father and retired Sultan for illness :
  Knight Grand Commander (Datuk Patinggi) of the Order of the Star of Hornbill Sarawak  (DP) with title Datuk Patinggi
 Darjah Paduka Seri Sarawak (DPSS)

Asian honours 
They have been awarded:

Far East

Brunei 
 Muhammad V of Kelantan :
  Sultan of Brunei Golden Jubilee Medal (5 October 2017)
 Ismail Petra of Kelantan, Sultan Muhammad V of Kelantan's father and retired Sultan for illness :
  Recipient of Royal Family Order of the Crown of Brunei (DKMB)
 Raja Perempuan Tengku Anis, Sultan Muhammad V of Kelantan's mother :
  Recipient of Royal Family Order of the Crown of Brunei (DKMB)

To be completed if any other ...

Middle East   

To be completed if any ...

American  honours 
They have been awarded:

To be completed if any ...

European honours 
They have been awarded:

To be completed if any ...

African honours 
They have been awarded:

To be completed if any ...

References

Notes 

 
Kelantan